= Rubus scandens =

Scientific classification
- Kingdom: Plantae
- Clade: Tracheophytes
- Clade: Angiosperms
- Clade: Eudicots
- Clade: Rosids
- Order: Rosales
- Family: Rosaceae
- Genus: Rubus
- Species: R. scandens

Binomial name
- Rubus scandens Liebm. 1853 not Kupcsok 1907 nor Juss. ex Poir. 1804

Species of fruit and plant

Rubus scandens is an uncommon Mexican species of brambles in the rose family. It has been found only in the State of Veracruz in eastern Mexico.

Rubus scandens is a climbing perennial sometimes reaching 6 meters above the ground. Stems do not have prickles, but petioles do. Leaves are palmately compound with 5 thick, leathery leaflets. Flowers are white or pink. Fruits are dark purple, the drupelets falling apart separately.
